The Oriental worm-eel (Lamnostoma orientalis), also known as the Oriental snake eel, the Oriental sand-eel or the finny sand-eel, is an eel in the family Ophichthidae (worm/snake eels). It was described by John McClelland in 1844, originally under the genus Dalophis. It is a tropical, marine and freshwater-dwelling eel which is known from the Indo-Western Pacific, including Somalia, South Africa, India, Papua New Guinea, Tahiti, French Polynesia, Indonesia, Oman, Palau, New Caledonia, the Philippines, Sri Lanka, Seychelles, and Vanuatu.

The Oriental worm-eel is of minor commercial interest to fisheries; it is caught by hand and in nets, and is sold fresh, usually as bait. Its diet consists of invertebrates, small fish and prawns. The IUCN redlist currently lists it as Least Concern, due to its wide distribution and lack of reported threats. It notes, however, that freshwater pollution occurs in its range, and could pose a threat to the species.

References

Oriental worm-eel
Fish of the Indian Ocean
Least concern biota of Asia
Least concern biota of Oceania
Oriental worm-eel